The Trinidad and Tobago football league system, also known as the football pyramid, is a series of interconnected leagues for men's association football clubs in Trinidad and Tobago. The system has a hierarchical format with promotion and relegation between leagues at different levels and is governed by the Trinidad and Tobago Football Association at the national level. There are over eight individual leagues, containing more than ten divisions. The exact number of clubs varies from year to year as clubs join and leave leagues or fold altogether, but an estimated average of 10 clubs per division implies that more than 100 clubs are members of a league in the Trinidad and Tobago football league system.

Structure
At the top is the single division of the TT Pro League (which is often referred to as the "top flight"), containing ten clubs. Below the Pro League is the National Super League (Level 2), which contains 13 clubs. All the teams in the Pro League are full-time professional teams, but the Super League is semi-professional containing a few clubs that have close affiliations with Pro League clubs.  

Outside the top two levels of the pyramid, at Levels 3 and 4, are the six regional football association leagues. Each regional association operates its own respective top division (Level 3): Premier Division (Central Football Association), Premier Division (Eastern Football Association), Football Union (Eastern Counties), Premier Division (Northern Football Association), Premier Division (Southern Football Association), and Premier Division (Tobago Football Association).these clubs are amateur, The amateur leagues that operate a second-tier division (Level 4) are the Northern FA, Southern FA, and Tobago FA.

Promotion and relegation
TT Pro League (level 1, 10 clubs): Top team becomes Champions of Trinidad and Tobago, (no promotion). No automatic relegation.
National Super League (level 2, 13 clubs): No automatic promotion and clubs may apply for admission into level 1. However, clubs with an affiliation with a current Level 1 club may not be promoted. Bottom two clubs are relegated, to each club's appropriate regional football association league.
Regional FA Leagues (level 3, 60 clubs in 6 regional leagues): Top club in each football association's regional league compete in the promotion playoffs, with the top two teams gaining promotion. Each league has its own promotion and relegation rules.

Cup eligibility
Being members of a league at a particular level also affects eligibility for Cup, or single-elimination, competitions.

FA Trophy: Levels 1–3
TOYOTA Classic: Levels 1–2
First Citizens Cup: Level 1
Digicel Pro Bowl: Level 1
Lucozade Sport Goal Shield: Level 1
National Super League Cup: Level 2

Beyond Level 2 the pyramid becomes regional and the cups become accordingly regional. Further down the pyramid is split on a football association basis, with each association having their own cups accordingly.

The system
The table below shows the current structure of the system. For each division, its official name, sponsorship name, and number of clubs is given. At levels 1–4, each division promotes to the division(s) that lie directly above it and relegates to the division(s) that lie directly below it.

See also

 Association football in Trinidad and Tobago
 League system, for a list of similar systems in other countries.

References

External links
Trinidad and Tobago Football Association
TT Pro League, Official Website
Soca Warriors Online

    
Football league systems in North America